Sędziejowice  is a village in Łask County, Łódź Voivodeship, in central Poland. It is the seat of the gmina (administrative district) called Gmina Sędziejowice. The village has an approximate population of 840.

During the January Uprising, on August 26, 1863, it was the site of the Battle of Sędziejowice, in which Polish insurgents led by General Edmund Taczanowski defeated Russian troops. From 1939 to 1945, the village was incorporated into the Third Reich, although after the war the village was again incorporated into Poland.

References

Villages in Łask County